Wanderlust is a strong desire  to wander or travel and explore the world.

Etymology
The first documented use of the term in English occurred in 1902 as a reflection of what was then seen as a characteristically German predilection for wandering that may be traced back to German Romanticism and the German system of apprenticeship (the journeyman), as well as the custom of adolescent wanderings in search of unity with nature.

Sociology
Robert E. Park in the early twentieth century saw wanderlust as in opposition to the values of status and organisation, while postmodernism would by contrast see it largely as playfully empowering.

Among tourists, sociologists distinguish sunlust from wanderlust as motivating forces – the former primarily seeking relaxation, the latter engagement with different cultural experiences.

Psychology
Wanderlust may reflect an intense urge for self-development by experiencing the unknown, confronting unforeseen challenges, getting to know unfamiliar cultures, ways of life and behaviours or may be driven by the desire to escape and leave behind depressive feelings of guilt, and has been linked to bipolar disorder in the periodicity of the attacks.

In adolescence, dissatisfaction with the restrictions of home and locality may also fuel the desire to travel.

See also

References

Further reading
Rebecca Solnit, Wanderlust: A History of Walking (2009)
Wolfgang Schivelbusch, The Railway Journey (1980)
S. D. Ezrahi, Booking Passage (2000)

Adventure travel
Diaspora studies
Expatriates
German words and phrases
Itinerant living